Narmoch is a rural locality (a village) in Posyolok Zolotkovo, Gus-Khrustalny District, Vladimir Oblast, Russia. The population was 77 as of 2010.

Geography 
Narmoch is located 29 km east of Gus-Khrustalny (the district's administrative centre) by road. Lesnikovo is the nearest rural locality.

References 

Rural localities in Gus-Khrustalny District